Proprioseiopsis involutus is a species of mite in the family Phytoseiidae.

References

involutus
Articles created by Qbugbot
Animals described in 1978